Universities, colleges, and seminaries currently affiliated with the Southern Baptist Convention or affiliated with state conventions that are associated with the SBC.

Universities 
The Southern Baptist Convention maintains a directory of Southern Baptist related colleges and universities.

 Anderson University (Anderson, South Carolina)
 Averett University (Danville, Virginia)
 Baptist College of Florida (Graceville, Florida)
 Baptist University of the Américas (San Antonio, Texas)
 Baylor University (Waco, Texas)
 Blue Mountain College (Blue Mountain, Mississippi)
 Bluefield University (Bluefield, Virginia)
 Brewton-Parker College (Mount Vernon, Georgia)
 California Baptist University (Riverside, California)
 Campbell University (Buies Creek, North Carolina)
 Carson–Newman University (Jefferson City, Tennessee)
 Cedarville University (Cedarville, Ohio)
 Charleston Southern University (Charleston, South Carolina)
 Chowan University (Murfreesboro, North Carolina)
 Clear Creek Baptist Bible College (Pineville, Kentucky)
 Criswell College (Dallas, Texas)
 University of the Cumberlands (Williamsburg, Kentucky)
 Dallas Baptist University (Dallas, Texas)
 Davis College (Johnson City, New York)
 East Texas Baptist University (Marshall, Texas)
 Fruitland Baptist Bible College (Hendersonville, North Carolina)
 Gardner–Webb University (Boiling Springs, North Carolina)
 Georgetown College (Kentucky) (Georgetown, Kentucky)
 Hannibal-LaGrange University (Hannibal, Missouri)
 Hardin-Simmons University (Abilene, Texas)
 Houston Christian University (Houston, Texas)
 Howard Payne University (Brownwood, Texas)
 Jacksonville College (Jacksonville, Texas)
 Judson College (Alabama) (Marion, Alabama)
 Liberty University (Lynchburg, Virginia)
 Louisiana Christian University (Pineville, Louisiana)
 Mars Hill University (Mars Hill, North Carolina)
 University of Mary Hardin-Baylor (Belton, Texas)
 Mississippi College (Clinton, Mississippi)
 Missouri Baptist University (St. Louis, Missouri)
 University of Mobile (Mobile, Alabama)
 North Greenville University (Tigerville, South Carolina)
 Northeastern Baptist College (Bennington, Vermont)
 Oklahoma Baptist University (Shawnee, Oklahoma)
 Ouachita Baptist University (Arkadelphia, Arkansas)
 Samford University (Homewood, Alabama)
 Shorter University (Rome, Georgia)
 Southwest Baptist University (Bolivar, Missouri)
 Truett-McConnell University (Cleveland, Georgia)
 Union University (Jackson, Tennessee)
 Wayland Baptist University (Plainview, Texas)
 William Carey University (Hattiesburg, Mississippi)
 Williams Baptist University (Walnut Ridge, Arkansas)
 Wingate University (Wingate, North Carolina)
 Yellowstone Baptist College (Billings, Montana)

Seminaries 
The SBC directly supports 6 theological seminaries.
 Gateway Seminary (Fremont, California)
 Midwestern Baptist Theological Seminary (Kansas City, Missouri)
 New Orleans Baptist Theological Seminary (New Orleans, Louisiana)
 Southeastern Baptist Theological Seminary (Wake Forest, North Carolina)
 Southern Baptist Theological Seminary (Louisville, Kentucky)
 Southwestern Baptist Theological Seminary (Fort Worth, Texas)

References

 
Lists of Christian universities and colleges